Knut Nesbø (26 April 1961 – 8 February 2013) was a Norwegian sports reporter with the Norwegian Broadcasting Corporation.

He was also a former semi-professional footballer (soccer player) who played for Molde and Lyn in the 1980s. In 1990, he played nineteen league matches for low-level Stabæk IF.

He was the guitarist of the Norwegian pop/rock band Di Derre, which also featured his brother Jo Nesbø as the lead singer.

References

1961 births
2013 deaths
People from Molde
Norwegian guitarists
Norwegian male guitarists
Norwegian newspaper journalists
Norwegian television journalists
NRK people
Norwegian footballers
Norwegian First Division players
Molde FK players
Lyn Fotball players
Stabæk Fotball players
Deaths from cancer in Norway
Association footballers not categorized by position